Tylopilus gomezii is a bolete fungus in the family Boletaceae found in Costa Rica, where it grows under oak in montane woodland. It was described as new to science in 1991 by mycologist Rolf Singer.

References

External links

gomezii
Fungi described in 1991
Fungi of Central America
Taxa named by Rolf Singer